Przemysław Miarczyński (born 26 August 1979) is a Polish windsurfer and Olympic athlete.

Miarczyński already competed at the top-level when he was a teenager, becoming a multiple medal winner in Junior and Youth World Championships.  During the 2000 Summer Olympics in Sydney, he finished in eighth position in the mistral class.  In 2001 he won a silver medal at the Junior and Senior World Championships.  He became World Champion in 2003 and finished in fifth position during the 2004 Summer Olympics.  In the Olympic season, he also became European Champion and a World Champion runner-up.

Miarczyński won the bronze medal at the 2006 RS:X World Championships.  He finished only one point behind world champion Casper Bouman and Tom Ashley who had as much points as Bouman.  The gap between Miarczyński and fourth placed Joeri van Dijk was 24 points.

At the 2012 Summer Olympics, he won the bronze medal in the RS:X class.

Achievements

References

External links
 
 
 
 Przemysław Miarczyński - Polish Sailing Encyclopedia 

1979 births
Living people
Polish windsurfers
Polish male sailors (sport)
Olympic sailors of Poland
Olympic bronze medalists for Poland
Olympic medalists in sailing
Sailors at the 2000 Summer Olympics – Mistral One Design
Sailors at the 2004 Summer Olympics – Mistral One Design
Sailors at the 2008 Summer Olympics – RS:X
Sailors at the 2012 Summer Olympics – RS:X
Medalists at the 2012 Summer Olympics
People from Sopot
Sportspeople from Pomeranian Voivodeship